Óengus Ollom, according to medieval Irish legend and historical tradition, was a High King of Ireland who was the son of Ailill, the son of Labraid Loingsech. He took power after he killed the previous incumbent, Mug Corb, and ruled for eighteen years, until he was killed by Irereo, son of Meilge Molbthach. The Lebor Gabála Érenn synchronizes his reign with that of Ptolemy III Euergetes of Egypt (246–222 BC). The chronology of Geoffrey Keating's Foras Feasa ar Éirinn dates his reign to 355–337 BC, the Annals of the Four Masters to 499–481 BC.

References

Legendary High Kings of Ireland
4th-century BC rulers
Regicides
Usurpers
4th-century BC murdered monarchs